Fjärdhundra is a locality situated in Enköping Municipality, Uppsala County, Sweden with 951 inhabitants in 2010.

The name was given to a railway station in 1906, taken from the region Fjärdhundraland, which means land of the four hundreds, where in Sweden hundred meant an area having one hundred trained soldiers or shipsmen.

References 

Populated places in Uppsala County
Populated places in Enköping Municipality